Élisabeth Camus is a French former racing cyclist. She won the French national road race title in 1973.

References

External links
 

Year of birth missing (living people)
Living people
French female cyclists
Sportspeople from Grenoble
Cyclists from Auvergne-Rhône-Alpes